Cyclone Bliss is a 1921 American silent Western film directed by Francis Ford and starring Jack Hoxie, Evelyn Nelson and Fred Kohler.

Cast
 Jack Hoxie as Jack Bliss
 Frederick Moore as Bill Turner
 Evelyn Nelson as Helen Turner
 Fred Kohler as Jack Hall
 Steve Clemente as Pedro 
 William Dyer as Slim
 James T. Kelley as Jimmie Donahue

References

External links
 

1921 films
1921 Western (genre) films
Films directed by Francis Ford
Arrow Film Corporation films
Silent American Western (genre) films
1920s English-language films
1920s American films